Cassens is a surname. Notable people with the surname include:

 Dale Cassens (1935–1987), American politician
 Monika Cassens (born 1953), German former badminton player

See also
 Cassels
 Cassen (disambiguation)